Acanthodica splendens is a moth of the family Noctuidae. It is found in Panama and Ecuador.

Catocalina
Moths of Central America
Moths of South America
Moths described in 1889